Johannes Hendricus Heuckelbach (5 March 1893, Amsterdam – 18 June 1976, Amsterdam) was a Dutch boxer who competed in the 1920 Summer Olympics. In 1920 he was eliminated in the first round of the welterweight class after losing his fight to Ivan Schannong of Denmark.

References

External links
 list of Dutch boxers 

1893 births
1976 deaths
Welterweight boxers
Olympic boxers of the Netherlands
Boxers at the 1920 Summer Olympics
Boxers from Amsterdam
Dutch male boxers